Goloshchyokin, Goloshchekin, or  Goloschekin, feminine: Goloshchyokina, etc. is a Russian-language surname derived from the nickname Голощёк, literally "a person with bare cheeks". The surname may refer to:

Filipp Goloshchyokin, Soviet Bolshevik functionary
David Goloschekin, Russian jazz musician

Russian-language surnames